Shabanie Mine is a Zimbabwean football club based in Zvishavane. They play in the ZIFA Division One Central Region.

References

Shabanie Mine FC has often been a source of inspiration to the town of Zvishavane. Even in the towns toughest times the locals have always found relief in watching bvaru play

Football clubs in Zimbabwe